The 1980 Australian federal election was held in Australia on 18 October 1980. All 125 seats in the House of Representatives and 34 of the 64 seats in the Senate were up for election. The incumbent Liberal–NCP coalition government, led by Prime Minister Malcolm Fraser, was elected to a third term with a much reduced majority, defeating the opposition Labor Party led by Bill Hayden. This was the last federal election victory for the Coalition until the 1996 election.

Future Prime Minister Bob Hawke and future opposition leader and future Deputy Prime Minister Kim Beazley entered parliament at this election.

Issues and significance
The Fraser Government had lost a degree of popularity within the electorate by 1980. The economy had been performing poorly since the 1973 oil shock. However, Hayden was not seen as having great electoral prospects. Perhaps as evidence of this, then ACTU President Bob Hawke (elected to parliament in the election as the member for Wills) and then Premier of New South Wales Neville Wran featured heavily in the campaign, almost as heavily as Hayden.

Results

House of Representatives

Senate

Notes

 Independent: Brian Harradine

Seats changing hands

 Members listed in italics did not contest their seat at this election.

Aftermath

In the election, Labor finished only 0.8 percent behind the Coalition on the two-party vote—a four-percent swing from 1977. However, due to the uneven nature of the swing, Labor came up 12 seats short of a majority, giving the Coalition a third term in government.  Hayden, however, did manage to regain much of what Labor had lost in the previous two elections. Notably, he managed to more than halve Fraser's majority, from 48 seats at dissolution to 23.

In the subsequent term, the government delivered budgets significantly in deficit, and Fraser was challenged for the Liberal leadership by Andrew Peacock. The Australian Democrats made further gains, winning the balance of power in the Senate. From July 1981 (when those senators elected at the 1980 election took up their positions) no Federal Government in Australia had a Senate majority until the Howard government won such a majority in 2004.

See also
 Candidates of the Australian federal election, 1980
 Members of the Australian House of Representatives, 1980–1983
 Members of the Australian Senate, 1981–1983

Notes

References
AustralianPolitics.com election details
University of WA  election results in Australia since 1890
AEC 2PP vote
Prior to 1984 the AEC did not undertake a full distribution of preferences for statistical purposes. The stored ballot papers for the 1983 election were put through this process prior to their destruction. Therefore, the figures from 1983 onwards show the actual result based on full distribution of preferences.

1980 elections in Australia
Federal elections in Australia
Malcolm Fraser
October 1980 events in Australia